The La Brea poison frog (Oophaga occultator, formerly Dendrobates occultator) is a species of frogs in the family Dendrobatidae endemic to the Cordillera Occidental in the Cauca Department of Colombia.

This species lives mainly on the ground in undisturbed, lowland rainforest, but it can also be found perching on leaves at different levels above the ground. There are no degraded habitats within its tiny known range, and so its adaptability to secondary habitats is unknown. There is no information on its breeding habits, but it is likely to be similar to Oophaga histrionica, where the eggs are laid on the ground, and the tadpoles are transported to bromeliads by the female. There is little direct information on threats to this species, but the major threats are likely to include deforestation due to agricultural development, cultivation of illegal crops, logging, and human settlement, and also pollution resulting from the spraying of illegal crops. This species has never been involved in the international pet trade.

References

Oophaga
Amphibians of Colombia
Endemic fauna of Colombia
Amphibians described in 1976
Taxonomy articles created by Polbot